Pulp is a 1972 British comedy thriller film, directed by Mike Hodges and starring Michael Caine as Mickey King, a writer of cheap paperback detective novels. The film features the final screen appearance of Lizabeth Scott.

Pulp, originally titled Memoirs of a Ghost Writer, was almost entirely shot on the island of Malta. Facilities were provided by the then Malta Film Facilities and Intermed Sound Studio, later known as Britannia Film Sound Studios.

Plot
Writer Mickey King lives in Malta churning out a string of violent, sexually charged hardboiled pulp fiction novels under an array of lewd pen names like "S. Odomy".

King is offered an abnormally large sum to ghostwrite the autobiography of a mystery celebrity. The intrigued King agrees and is transported to a remote island, during which time he will make contact with a representative for the celebrity. King meets a man named Miller, who identifies himself as an English professor. King assumes Miller is the mysterious contact—until discovering Miller dead in his bathtub after a hotel room mix-up.

Finally arriving on the island, King meets his subject: Preston Gilbert. A retired movie star, Gilbert is known for portraying gangsters and notorious for hanging out with real-life mobsters off the set. Now suffering from cancer, the pompous, vain Gilbert wants King to immortalize his life story before he dies.

Gilbert is planning a fancy birthday celebration. Among the attendees is Princess Betty Cippola, a man-hungry social climber who seems to have a sordid history with Gilbert. However, after the party is underway and Gilbert has staged a practical joke, Miller returns, now dressed as a Catholic priest. Sensing danger, King flees as Miller opens fire, killing Gilbert. The partygoers assume it's another prank, and applaud as Gilbert dies.

Gilbert's death leaves King with no conclusion to his tale. Playing detective like the heroes of his stories, King pieces together the mystery. He learns that Gilbert's proposed autobiography has alarmed several of the actor's erstwhile associates, who worry their schemes and crimes might be exposed.

Cast
 Michael Caine as Mickey King
 Mickey Rooney as Preston Gilbert
 Lionel Stander as Ben Dinuccio
 Lizabeth Scott as Princess Betty Cippola
 Nadia Cassini as Liz Adams
 Dennis Price as The Englishman
 Al Lettieri as Miller
 Leopoldo Trieste as Marcovic
 Amerigo Tot as Partisan
 Robert Sacchi as The Bogeyman
 Ave Ninchi as Fat Chambermaid

References

External links 
 
 
 

1972 films
1970s comedy thriller films
British comedy thriller films
1970s parody films
British parody films
Films about writers
Films directed by Mike Hodges
Films set in Italy
Films shot in Malta
British neo-noir films
United Artists films
1970s English-language films
Films scored by George Martin
1972 comedy films
1970s British films